The People's Progressive Party is a political party in the Gambia. It was the dominant ruling party of the House of Representatives and the presidency from 1962 to 1994. The president throughout this time period was Dawda Jawara. The People's Progressive Party lost power after the 1994 Gambian coup d'état, a military coup led by young, junior military officers. The Alliance for Patriotic Reorientation and Construction (APRC) then became the dominant party of the Gambia. The People's Progressive Party remains active, but lacking the same level of support it garnered in the 20th century.

History
The party was founded in 1959 as the Protectorate People's Party (PPP) and was later changed to the People's Progressive Party. The party won the 1962 general election, and in October 1963, upon the attainment of self-government, their leader, Dawda Jawara, became Prime Minister of the Gambia. With the republican referendum in 1970, Jawara became the first President of the Gambia.

The 1981 Gambian coup d'état attempt was an attempt to overthrow the incumbent government when the PPP was in power. It was a civilian led coup-attempt with some support from the Gambia Field Force. The death toll is debated, being anywhere from 500 to 1,000 lives lost. The coup was put down by Senegalese intervention and as a result, Senegal and the Gambia formed the Senegambia Confederation.

The People's Progressive Party lost political power following the 1994 Gambian coup d'état. The coup was carried out by military officers in the Gambian National Army (GNA). It was a bloodless coup that managed to overthrow Dawda Jawara. The Gambia was ruled militarily until 1996 when Yahya Jammeh was elected as president with the Alliance for Patriotic Reorientation and Construction (APRC) as his party. The subsequent National Assembly elections brought even more power to the APRC, winning 33 out of the 45 seats.

The People's Progressive Party was banned by the APRC in all subsequent elections; however, it has joined with other opposition parties to form political coalitions. In 2005, the PPP joined the opposition coalition National Alliance for Democracy and Development (NADD). Then for the 2016 presidential election, PPP joined the Coalition 2016, where Adama Barrow was declared the coalition's candidate and subsequently won.

Ideology 
The People's Progressive Party was created by rural populations as a reaction against urban areas exerting control over the political arena post-colonialism.

The People's Progressive Party's website currently states, "The PPP believes that a less pervasive and intrusive government as opposed to the current over-centralized and authoritarian regime is necessary in order to release the creative energies of the Gambian people and to encourage wider social, economic, and political inclusion. Our party intends to reduce the power of government and return to grassroots democracy."

Opposition 
Throughout the People's Progressive Party's period in Gambian national spotlight, there were times of growing discontent with the government. Not only did opposition candidates stem from that discontent, but many opposition parties were created to run against the PPP.

National Convention Party (NCP) 
The National Convention Party (NCP) was an opposition party to the PPP launched on September 7, 1975. The leader of the party at the time was Sheriff M. Dibba, the former first Vice-President of the Gambia. After a political scandal, he resigned as Vice-President in 1972 and later founded the NCP.

The 1981 Gambian coup d'état was led by a former NCP candidate. Members of the People's Progressive Party suspected that the NCP was in support of the coup attempt and subsequently, many members of the NCP were arrested.

In the 1987 elections, the NCP won five seats in the legislature. Though Dawda Jawara won the presidential election, Dibba, the presidential candidate from the NCP, won 28% of the vote. Then in 1992, the NCP won six seats in the legislature.

Alliance for Patriotic Reorientation and Construction (APRC) 
The Alliance for Patriotic Reorientation and Construction (APRC) is a political party formed after the 1994 coup d'état. The ideology that led to the coup was discontent with the PPP; alleged corruption and a lack of economic development over time. The main figure that dominated the APRC was Yahya Jammeh, who became president in 1996 and served until the 2016 Gambian presidential election. Under Jammeh and the APRC's rule, there were numerous reports of human rights abuses and suppression of the media.

Notable members

Sir Dawda Kairaba Jawara 

Sir Dawda Kairaba Jawara served as the leader of the People's Progressive Party from 1959 until 1994 when he was overthrown. He is responsible for changing the name of the party from the Protectorate People's Party to the People's Progressive Party. Before serving as president for the Gambia he was elected into the legislature in 1960. During this time, he also served as the minister of education. He later became the prime minister of the Gambia in 1962 and was knighted in 1966, following independence. Upon the creation of a new constitution in 1970, Jawara became the president and served until the 1994 Gambian coup d'état.

Following the coup, Jawara was exiled and lived in Senegal and later London. He was later given amnesty but was not given the right to participate in the Gambian political arena.  He formally resigned as PPP leader in 2002.

Jawara died on August 27, 2019 at 95 years old.

Omar A. Jallow 
Omar A. Jallow succeeded Jawara as leader of the People's Progressive Party. He was a member of Dawda Jawara's cabinet up until the 1994 coup d'état, when he was arrested. Under the Jammeh administration, he was reportedly jailed over 22 times.

After Jammeh was not re-elected following the 2016 Gambian presidential election, Jallow was appointed the minister of agriculture as he was in the Jawara administration.

At the 2018 national convention, the party's first since its ban was lifted, Jallow stepped down as leader.  Papa Njie was elected in his place.  In 2020, Njie was appointed as the Gambian High Commissioner to Nigeria.  Kebba E. Jallow then became interim leader, and was elected as leader at the party's 2021 national convention.

Electoral history

Presidential elections

National Assembly elections

References

Political parties in the Gambia
Main